Qihao Weng (born June 1964 in Fuzhou, China) is a Chinese-American geographer, urban, environmental sustainability and remote sensing scientist. He is a Chair Professor at the Hong Kong Polytechnic University since July 2021, and was the Director of the Center for Urban and Environmental Change (since July 2004) and a professor of geography in the Department of Earth and Environmental Systems at the Indiana State University.

Weng is currently the Lead of the Group on Earth Observations’ (GEO) Global Urban Observation and Information Initiative. He is also an editor-in-chief of ISPRS Journal of Photogrammetry and Remote Sensing, the official peer-reviewed publication of the International Society for Photogrammetry and Remote Sensing. Additionally, he serves as the book series editor of Taylor & Francis Series in Remote Sensing Applications and Taylor & Francis Series in Imaging Science.

Weng is an elected foreign member of Academia Europaea (The Academy of Europe), a fellow of the American Association for the Advancement of Science, the Institute of Electrical and Electronics Engineers, the American Association of Geographers, the American Society for Photogrammetry and Remote Sensing, and the Asia-Pacific Artificial Intelligence Association.

Early life and education 
Weng grew up in Fuzhou, a city in the southeastern coast of China. He received his undergraduate education in Geography from Minjiang University in 1984. After working as a middle school teacher for three years, he went to Guangzhou, studied and received a master's degree from South China Normal University in Physical Geography in 1990. In 1993, he came to the United States, obtained another master's degree from the University of Arizona in Geography in 1996, and finally a PhD in Geography from the University of Georgia in 1999. His dissertation focuses on the environmental impacts of land use and land cover change under the influence of rapid industrialization and urbanization. By using the Pearl River Delta of southern China as an example, his research examines the impacts of China's economic reform policy (since the late 1970s) on environmental and ecological processes. He approached this problem through an integrated approach of remote sensing, GIS, and spatial environmental modeling by utilizing satellite images, existing maps, statistics, and field survey data.

Career 
In 1999, Weng began teaching and researching at the University of Alabama. He successfully secured a funding from the National Geographic Society to study Guangzhou's urban growth and its impact on local climate and air quality, and to model and monitor urban heat islands using satellite temperature measurements.

In 2001, he was appointed as a tenure-track assistant professor of geography at Indiana State University, becoming a tenured associate professor in 2005 and full professor in 2009. He was a National Director of American Society for Photogrammetry and Remote Sensing, 2007–2010, representing Western Great Lakes Region.

From December 2008 to December 2009, he worked at NASA Marshall Space Flight Center as a senior fellow. Some of his research has focused on urbanization effects on climate and surface energy balance.

In 2019, he was awarded a fellowship from Japan Society for the Promotion of Science under the "JSPS Invitational Fellowships for Research in Japan" (Short-term S). He worked at Faculty of Life and Environmental Sciences, the University of Tsukuba.

He started to work at the Hong Kong Polytechnic University since July 2021 as a Chair Professor of Geomatics and Artificial Intelligence, and was awarded a Global STEM Professorship.

Weng's work focuses on remote sensing applications to urban environmental and ecological systems, land-use and land-cover changes, urbanization impacts, spatial environmental modeling, and human-environment interactions. Through a serial invention of innovative algorithms, techniques, methods and theories for urban remote sensing, his research fosters the science and technology of remote sensing and satellite imaging in geographical and environmental applications.

His 2004 paper, Estimation of land surface temperature–vegetation abundance relationship for urban heat island studies, developed a methodology for estimating land surface temperature with satellite-derived measures of vegetation that has become a core technique for those investigating urban climates. Weng's seminal research on urban heat islands, landscape effects on land surface temperature, and urbanization processes opened a critical new frontier towards understanding and measuring novel environmental risks in rapidly growing urban regions. His research has also demonstrated that urban sprawl and warming are not an isolated phenomenon, but instead are coupled with other risk factors, such as infectious disease.

Awards and honors 

 2021 - Foreign Member, Academia Europaea (i.e., The Academy of Europe).
 2021 - Fellow, American Association of Geographers (AAG).
 2021 - Fellow, Asia-Pacific Artificial Intelligence Association (AAIA).
 2020 - Fellow, American Society for Photogrammetry and Remote Sensing (ASPRS).
 2020 - AAG Distinguished Scholarship Honors, American Association of Geographers (AAG).
 2019 - Invitational Fellowships for Research in Japan (Short-term S[E]), Japan Society for the Promotion of Science.
 2019 - Taylor & Francis Lifetime Achievement Award.
 2019 - Fellow, American Association for the Advancement of Science (AAAS).
 2018 - Fellow, Institute of Electrical and Electronics Engineers (IEEE).
 2018 - Notable Alumnus of Minjiang University: received the title of Notable Alumnus and gave a speech representing the alumni at the university's 60th anniversary celebration, Oct 28, 2018.
 2015 - Willard and Ruby S. Miller Award, American Association of Geographers (AAG).
 2011 - Outstanding Contributions Award in Remote Sensing, American Association of Geographers (AAG).
 2008 - Senior Fellowship Award, National Aeronautics and Space Administration.

Selected works

Journal articles 
 Weng, Q. 2001. A remote sensing-GIS evaluation of urban expansion and its impact on surface temperature in the Zhujiang Delta, China. International Journal of Remote Sensing, 22(10), 1999-2014. DOI: https://doi.org/10.1080/713860788
 Weng, Q. 2002. Land use change analysis in the Zhujiang Delta of China using satellite remote sensing, GIS, and stochastic modeling. Journal of Environmental Management, 64(3), 273-284. DOI: https://doi.org/10.1006/jema.2001.0509
 Weng, Q.*, Lu, D. and J. Schubring. 2004. Estimation of land surface temperature-vegetation abundance relationship for urban heat island studies. Remote Sensing of Environment, 89(4), 467-483. DOI: https://doi.org/10.1016/j.rse.2003.11.005
 Weng, Q. 2009. Thermal infrared remote sensing for urban climate and environmental studies: methods, applications, and trends. ISPRS Journal of Photogrammetry and Remote Sensing, 64(4), 335-344. DOI: https://doi.org/10.1016/j.isprsjprs.2009.03.007
 Weng, Q. 2012. Remote sensing of impervious surfaces in the urban areas: requirements, methods, and trends. Remote Sensing of Environment, 117(2), 34-49. DOI: https://doi.org/10.1016/j.rse.2011.02.030
 Weng, Q.*, Fu, P. and F. Gao. 2014. Generating daily land surface temperature at Landsat resolution by fusing Landsat and MODIS data. Remote Sensing of Environment, 145, 55-67. DOI: https://doi.org/10.1016/j.rse.2014.02.003
 Xie, Y., Weng, Q. and P. Fu. 2019. Temporal variations of artificial nighttime lights and their implications for urbanization in the conterminous United States, 2013–2017, Remote Sensing of Environment, 225, 160-174. DOI: https://doi.org/10.1016/j.rse.2019.03.008
 Zheng, Y. and Q. Weng.* 2019. Modeling the effect of climate change on building energy demand in Los Angeles County by using a GIS-based high spatial- and temporal-resolution approach, Energy, 176, 641-655. DOI: https://doi.org/10.1016/j.energy.2019.04.052
 Firozjaei, M.K., Weng, Q.*, Zhao, C., Kiavarz, M., Lu, L. and S.K. Alavipanah. 2020. Surface anthropogenic heat islands in six megacities: an assessment based on a triple-source surface energy balance model, Remote Sensing of Environment, 242(6), 111751. DOI: https://doi.org/10.1016/j.rse.2020.111751
 Zheng, Q., Weng, Q.* and K. Wang*. 2021. Characterizing urban land changes of 30 global megacities using nighttime light time series stacks, ISPRS Journal of Photogrammetry and Remote Sensing, 173(3), 10-23. DOI: https://doi.org/10.1016/j.isprsjprs.2021.01.002

Books 
 Weng, Q. 2009. Remote Sensing and GIS Integration: Theories, Methods, and Applications. New York: McGraw-Hill Professional, pp. 397. (Its Chinese translation has been published by Science Press, Beijing, in September 2011)
 Weng, Q. 2012. An Introduction to Contemporary Remote Sensing. New York: McGraw-Hill Professional, pp. 320.
 Zhang, H. Lin, H. Zhang, Y. and Q. Weng. 2015. Remote Sensing of Impervious Surfaces in Tropical and Subtropical Areas. Boca Raton, FL: CRC Press/Taylor and Francis, pp. 174.
 Weng, Q. 2019. Techniques and Methods in Urban Remote Sensing. Hoboken, NJ: Wiley-IEEE Press, pp. 353.

References

External links 
 Hong Kong Polytechnic University
 Asia-Pacific Artificial Intelligence Association

Chinese geographers
American geographers
1964 births
Living people